İrfan Kaynak (born 1 January 1956 - 1 January 1993) was a Turkish footballer best known for his stint in the Turkish Süper Lig with Adanaspor.

Death
İrfan died in 1993 of a heart attack, the same condition that killed his brothers Reşit and Kaynak.

Personal life
İrfan was born in to a large family of 8 children. His brothers Orhan, Reşit, Kaynak, İlhan and Ayhan were all professional footballers.

References

External links
 
 
 Profile Sport.de Profile]

1956 births
1993 deaths
Sportspeople from Adana
Turkish footballers
Mersin İdman Yurdu footballers
Adanaspor footballers
Süper Lig players
Association football forwards